Internal Drive may refer to:
 Internal drive propulsion, a form of marine propulsion commonly used in recreational boating
 ID Tech Camps, a computer camp, formerly referred to as "Internal Drive"